While many Slavic languages officially use Latin-derived names for the months of the year in the Gregorian calendar, there is also a set of older names for the twelve months that differs from the Latin month names, as they are of Slavic origin. In some languages, such as the Serbian language these traditional names have since been archaized and are thus seldom used.

The original names of the months of the year in the Slavic languages closely follow natural occurrences such as weather patterns and conditions common for that period, as well as agricultural activities.

Many months have several alternative names in different regions; conversely, a single "Slavic name" may correspond to different "Roman names" (for different months, usually following each other) in different languages.

Comparison table
The Slavic names of the months have been preserved by a number of Slavic people in a variety of languages. The conventional month names in some of these languages are mixed, including names which show the influence of the Germanic calendar (particularly Slovene, Sorbian, and Polabian) or names which are borrowed from the Gregorian calendar (particularly Polish and Kashubian), but they have been included here nonetheless.

In the Lithuanian language, the Baltic names of the months are preserved, which partially coincide with the Slavic ones, which suggests that some of these names may date back to the time of the Balto-Slavic unity. Lithuanian names are also shown in this table for comparison.

*Non-slavic

Croatian months
The Croatian months used with the Gregorian calendar by Croats differ from the original Latin month names:

Czech months
The names of Czech months are, as in Polish, Croatian, Ukrainian and Belarusian not based on the Latin names used in most European languages.
The suffix -en is added to most of the months' names.

Macedonian months

The Macedonian language has two sets of names of the months of the Gregorian calendar. The most commonly used set of names is derived from the Latin month names and these are used by the vast majority of the Macedonian population. However, there is also a set of older names for the twelve months of Slavic origin that differ from the Latin month names, although their usage is archaized and largely restricted to folk literature and religious calendars issued by the Macedonian Orthodox Church.

The origin of the Macedonian month names is closely related to the agricultural activities that occur in the corresponding period, or to the weather condition common for that period. Some months have alternative names in different regions. The usage of modern Latin month names among Macedonians started towards the end of the 19th century, as a result of mass education.

Slovene months

Many of the names in the standardized set of archaic Slovene month names first occur in the Škofja Loka manuscript, written in 1466 by Martin of Loka.

See also
 Lithuanian calendar
 Slavic Native Faith's calendars and holidays
 Germanic calendar
 Julian calendar
 Romanian calendar
 Slovene months

References

External links

 http://projetbabel.org/forum/viewtopic.php?t=7222 – A comprehensive table of Slavic and Baltic month names, explanation in French
 http://www.encyclopediaofukraine.com/display.asp?linkpath=pages\M\O\Monthsoftheyear.htm

Calendar
Months
Calendars